Vernon Martin "Jake" Schifino (born November 15, 1979 in Pittsburgh, Pennsylvania) is a former American football wide receiver. Schifino was originally drafted in the fifth round of the 2002 NFL Draft by the Tennessee Titans out of the University of Akron. He has also spent time with the Houston Texans.

References

1979 births
Living people
Sportspeople from Pennsylvania
American football wide receivers
Players of American football from Pennsylvania
Akron Zips football players
Tennessee Titans players
Houston Texans players